Pharoah is an unincorporated community in Okfuskee County, Oklahoma, United States. It is nine miles east of Okemah just south of Interstate 40 on US Route 75. The community was named after a rancher and cattleman, O.J. Pharoah. Oil and gas production have historically been important industries in Okfuskee County, and, in the 1920s, oil wells were drilled around Pharoah. A post office opened in Pharoah on June 8, 1921; the current nearest post office is in Weleetka.

References

Unincorporated communities in Okfuskee County, Oklahoma
Unincorporated communities in Oklahoma